Thomas B. Drage Jr (born December 19, 1948) was an American politician in the state of Florida.

Drage was born in Fort Myers and is an attorney. He served in the Florida House of Representatives for the 47th district from 1980 to 1990, as a Republican.

References

1948 births
Living people
Republican Party members of the Florida House of Representatives